The 2018–19 Segunda División Femenina de Fútbol was the 18th edition of the Spanish women's football second-tier league.

Competition format
The Segunda División was divided into seven inter-regional groups. Each group played their season as home and away round-robin format. The seven group champions (for group 6, the winner of the Canarian final) and the best runner-up qualified for the promotion playoffs.

In the promotion playoffs, the eight teams were divided by draw into two groups of four teams that played a double-leg knockout format. The two winners promoted to the Primera División.

Depending on how the format change is perceived, the top four teams of each group and the two best fifth qualified teams remain in/are promoted to the 2019–20 Segunda División Pro, together with the two relegated teams from Primera División, giving a total of 32 teams to be divided into two groups. All others (depending on the perception) remain in/are relegated to the 2019–20 Primera Nacional which becomes the third tier, retaining its setup of 7 groups of 14 teams.

Group 1

Group 2

Group 3

Group 4

Group 5

Group 6

Las Palmas Group

Tenerife Group

Canarian final
The winner of the Canarian final qualified to the promotion stage. After the refusal of Granadilla B, Tacuense was allowed to play the playoff.

Promotion playoff

Group 7

Ranking of second-placed teams

Ranking of fifth-placed teams

Promotion playoffs
The bracket was drawn on 23 April 2019.

References

Spa
2
Women2
Segunda División (women) seasons